Nola Barron (born 1931) is a New Zealand potter.

Barron has been a prominent member of New Zealand's studio pottery movement since the 1960s. She has studied under Yvonne Rust. She was an early member of the Canterbury Potter's Association, formed in 1963, to co-ordinate the common interests of potters in the Canterbury and West Coast regions.

Barron was director of the Canterbury Society of Arts between 1977 and 1986 (temporary director from 1976, the position was made permanent in 1984), and after her directorship remained a vice-president until 1988. She was appointed honorary curator at the Robert  McDougall art gallery (now part of the Christchurch Art Gallery Te Puna o Waiwhetu) alongside Peter Ireland.

Barron has exhibited throughout New Zealand, including with:
 Canterbury Society of Arts
 New Zealand Academy of Fine Arts
 The Group in 1967, 1968, 1970, 1974, 1976, and 1977
Her work is held in the collection of the Christchurch Art Gallery Te Puna o Waiwhetu.

References

Further reading 
Artist files for Nola Barron are held at:
 E. H. McCormick Research Library, Auckland Art Gallery Toi o Tāmaki
 Robert and Barbara Stewart Library and Archives, Christchurch Art Gallery Te Puna o Waiwhetu
 Te Aka Matua Research Library, Museum of New Zealand Te Papa Tongarewa
Also see:
 Potters in New Zealand: an illustrated directory of members of the New Zealand Society of Potters

External links 
 Nola Barron's potters mark

Living people
1931 births
New Zealand potters
Artists from Christchurch
New Zealand women artists
New Zealand sculptors
People associated with the Canterbury Society of Arts
New Zealand women ceramicists
New Zealand women sculptors
People associated with The Group (New Zealand art)